RMX may refer to

 RMX (operating system), a real-time operating system designed for use with Intel 8080 and 8086 processors
 Fast RMX, a Nintendo Switch racing video game
 Reverse MX, a computer protocol related to email transfer
 Risk Management Exchange, a financial market in Germany
 Remix, an alternative version of a recorded song, made from an original version